John Daly (1834 – August 1888) was an Irish Nationalist politician. He was elected to the  United Kingdom House of Commons as a Home Rule League Member of Parliament (MP) for Cork City at the 1880 general election, and joined the new Irish Parliamentary Party in 1882. He resigned his seat on 11 February 1884.

References

External links 
 

1834 births
1888 deaths
Members of the Parliament of the United Kingdom for Cork City
Home Rule League MPs
Irish Parliamentary Party MPs
UK MPs 1880–1885
Date of birth missing
Place of birth missing
Place of death missing